Adriana Năstase-Simion-Zamfir (born 6 July 1972) is a Romanian table tennis player. She competed at the 1992 Summer Olympics, the 1996 Summer Olympics, and the 2004 Summer Olympics.

References

1972 births
Living people
Romanian female table tennis players
Olympic table tennis players of Romania
Table tennis players at the 1992 Summer Olympics
Table tennis players at the 1996 Summer Olympics
Table tennis players at the 2004 Summer Olympics
Sportspeople from Bucharest